Passaloteuthis is a genus of belemnite, an extinct group of cephalopods. Belemnites are typically known for having about 40 micro-hooks on each one of its appendage. However, Passaloteuthis is notable for being associated with a pair of mega-hooks known as onychites. These hooks are tentatively interpreted as male-specific features, though their exact function is still unknown.

See also

 Belemnite
 List of belemnites

References

Belemnites